Laurent Miquelard (born 1970) is a French former tennis player.

Miquelard, a Paris native, was a collegiate tennis player for Mississippi State University in the early 1990s. He was one of several French players in the Mississippi State side during this time, including his doubles partner Daniel Courcol.

In 1994 he won the NCAA doubles championships with Joc Simmons, over USC's Wayne Black and Jon Leach. The pair then featured together in the doubles main draw of the 1994 US Open.

References

External links
 
 

1970 births
Living people
French male tennis players
Tennis players from Paris
Mississippi State Bulldogs tennis players